Artemis 5 (officially Artemis V) is the fifth planned mission and third crewed landing of NASA's Artemis Program. The mission will launch four astronauts on a Space Launch System rocket and an Orion to the south pole of the Moon. In addition, Artemis V will also deliver two new elements to the Gateway Space Station.

Overview 
Artemis V will launch four astronauts to the Gateway Space Station. The mission will deliver the European Space Agency's ESPRIT refueling and communications module and a Canadian-built robotic arm system for the Gateway. Also delivered will be NASA's Lunar Terrain Vehicle.

After docking to the Gateway, two astronauts will board to a docked Lunar Exploration Transportation Services lander and fly it down to the Lunar south pole with the Lunar Terrain Vehicle on board. This will be the first lunar landing since Apollo 17 to utilize an unpressurized lunar rover.

, Artemis V is scheduled to launch no earlier than September 2029.

Spacecraft

Space Launch System 
The Space Launch System is a super-heavy-lift launcher used to launch the Orion spacecraft from Earth to a trans-lunar orbit.

Orion 
Orion is the crew transport vehicle used by all Artemis missions. It will transport the crew from Earth to the Gateway orbit, and return them back to Earth.

Gateway 
Gateway is a small modular space station to be established in Near-rectilinear halo orbit (NRHO) in late 2024. The first two Gateway elements will launch together aboard a SpaceX Falcon Heavy in late 2024. The I-Hab habitat module will be delivered by Artemis 4.

Lunar Exploration Transportation Services (LETS) lander 
The LETS lander will transfer astronauts from the Gateway to the Lunar surface and back. The goal of LETS program is to develop one, and possibly more, landers from different companies to provide "sustainable" landing services. The LETS landers have not been selected yet, and may or may not include the SpaceX Lunar Starship.

Lunar Terrain Vehicle 
The Lunar Terrain Vehicle is an unenclosed rover being developed by NASA that astronauts will drive on the Moon while wearing their spacesuits.

References

External links 
 Orion website at nasa.gov
 Space Launch System website at nasa.gov

2029 in spaceflight
Artemis program
Crewed missions to the Moon
Orion (spacecraft)
Space Launch System
2029 in the United States
Missions to the Moon
Crewed spacecraft
Future human spaceflights
Lunar Gateway
Spaceflight
NASA space launch vehicles
Space stations